The 2022–23 Cornell Big Red Men's ice hockey season is the 106th season of play for the program. They represent Cornell University in the 2022–23 NCAA Division I men's ice hockey season and for the 61st season in the ECAC Hockey conference. They are coached by Mike Schafer, in his 27th season, and play their home games at Lynah Rink.

Season
Cornell won its 25th Ivy League title after defeating Yale in its final game of the regular season.

Departures

Recruiting

Roster
As of September 1, 2022.

Standings

Schedule and results

|-
!colspan=12 style=";" | Exhibition

|-
!colspan=12 style=";" | Regular Season

|-
!colspan=12 style=";" | 

|-
!colspan=12 style=";" |

Scoring statistics

Goaltending statistics

Rankings

References

2022-23
Cornell Big Red
Cornell Big Red
Cornell Big Red
Cornell Big Red